BlueShore Financial is a credit union in Canada with over 40,000 clients and $6.5 billion in assets under administration. Headquartered in the City of North Vancouver, British Columbia, BlueShore Financial operates as a full service financial institution for its clients, and has 12 branches throughout the Lower Mainland of British Columbia and in Squamish, Whistler, and Pemberton. Its subsidiaries include BlueShore Wealth, BlueShore Leasing, BlueShore Transport Finance, and BlueShore Capital. BlueShore Financial is the operating name of North Shore Credit Union.

Founded in 1941, the credit union is designated a "Caring Company" by the Canadian Centre for Philanthropy and is a  member of Canada's IMAGINE program. As an Imagine Canada Caring Company, BlueShore Financial supports the principles of corporate citizenship and benchmarks for community investment established by Imagine Canada. The organization agrees to commit a minimum of 1% of pre-tax profit to support charitable and non-profit organizations and to encourage the personal giving and volunteer activities of its employees. BlueShore Financial has been named among the "50 Best Small and Medium Employers in Canada" by Aon Hewitt, and "Canada's 10 Most Admired Corporate Cultures™" by Waterstone Human Capital. BlueShore Financial has also been honoured numerous times as one of the most technologically innovative financial institutions in North America.

BlueShore Financial is the title sponsor of Cornucopia in Whistler, was previously the presenting sponsor of the 2014, 2015, and 2016 Vancouver Sun Run, has named the BlueShore Financial Centre for the Performing Arts in partnership with Capilano University, and is a  supporter of many charitable organizations located throughout the Lower Mainland and Sea to Sky region in British Columbia.

BlueShore Financial is part of THE EXCHANGE Network owned by FICANEX.

References

External links

BlueShore Financial
Whistler Cornucopia

Credit unions of British Columbia
Banks established in 1941
1941 establishments in British Columbia
Companies based in North Vancouver